John Reinisch is an American physician specializing in plastic surgery. He is a pioneer in the field of pediatric plastic surgery, and developed the Medpor method of ear reconstruction for treatment of microtia. He founded the division of plastic surgery at Children's Hospital Los Angeles in 1983 and was also chairman of the division of plastic surgery at the University of Southern California, where he remains on the faculty. He is currently the director of Craniofacial and Pediatric Plastic Surgery at Cedars-Sinai Medical Center and a plastic surgeon at Cedars-Sinai Medical Group. He is also director of the Center for Ear Reconstruction. He developed many of the techniques currently in use for treatment of microtia, cleft lip and palate, wound care, post operative pain relief, vascular and pigmented birth marks,  and the use of tissue expansion in children. He has an international practice that was built in part on his early adoption of the use of telemedicine.

Dr. Reinisch works at the International Institute for Microtia Repair in Los Angeles. He has trained more than 100 surgeons in pediatric plastic surgery and travels extensively educating doctors, parents and patients. He has received numerous recognitions from Children's Hospital Los Angeles, the American Society of Plastic Surgeons, the American Association of Plastic Surgeons, the European Association of Plastic Surgeons, and has been repeatedly named one of the best doctors by Los Angeles Magazine, best children's specialist by Parent Magazine, and a top plastic surgeon for 10 consecutive years by Castle Connolly. Children’s Hospital Los Angeles sponsors an annual “John F. Reinisch MD Lectureship in Pediatric Plastic Surgery.”

Education
Board-certified by the American Board of Plastic Surgery, he earned his bachelor's degree from Dartmouth College and his medical degree from Harvard Medical School. He completed general surgery residencies at the University of Michigan and Tulane University School of Medicine, and a plastic surgery residency at University of Virginia. He did additional training in craniofacial surgery residency at New York University Medical Center and hand surgery at the University of Louisville.

Development of new ear reconstruction technique
In 1991, he developed a technique for ear reconstruction utilizing a porous polyethylene implant. This procedure has become increasingly popular because it can be performed on children as young as three years of age in a single surgery that is less painful than the standard procedure and requires no hospital stay, shortening the recovery time.

The Small Wonders Foundation
His work inspired parents of some of his young patients to start a nonprofit organization to help other children with similar congenital abnormalities. The Small Wonders Foundation was created in 2005 to provide information, financial assistance and encouragement to parents experiencing the difficulties of having children born with body or facial deformities.

References

Living people
American plastic surgeons
Harvard Medical School alumni
University of Michigan Medical School alumni
Dartmouth College alumni
Year of birth missing (living people)